Rashid Al-Athba (born 18 August 1980) is a Qatari shooter. He competed in the men's double trap at the 2004 Summer Olympics and the trap and double trap events at the 2012 Summer Olympics.

References

External links

1980 births
Living people
Qatari male sport shooters
Olympic shooters of Qatar
Shooters at the 2004 Summer Olympics
Shooters at the 2012 Summer Olympics
Asian Games medalists in shooting
Shooters at the 2002 Asian Games
Shooters at the 2006 Asian Games
Shooters at the 2010 Asian Games
Shooters at the 2014 Asian Games
Asian Games gold medalists for Qatar
Medalists at the 2014 Asian Games